= Bill Fleckenstein (finance) =

American financial columnist

Bill Fleckenstein is an American financial columnist and former hedge fund manager.

He is a 1979 graduate of University of Washington in mathematics.

He contributes to Financial Sense.

== Publications ==
- Bill Fleckenstein; Fred Sheehan (February 6, 2008). Greenspan's Bubbles: The Age of Ignorance at the Federal Reserve. McGraw Hill Professional. ISBN 978-0071591584.
